Crassispira latiriformis is a species of sea snail, a marine gastropod mollusk in the family Pseudomelatomidae.

Description
The length of the shell attains 17 mm, its diameter 6 mm.

(Original description) The fusiform shell has a fairly broadened body whorl, but a very attenuate spire It contains 9 whorls, of which the two whorls in the protoconch are smooth, diaphanous, and globular. The remainder show strong, rounded, shining, nodulous longitudinal ribs, about eight in number on the penultimate and body whorls. The suture is strongly raised-plicate, and spirally furnished with regular raised revolving lines, chestnut in colour, thus contrasting with the paler ochreous brown surface. These raised striae are very close and frequent on the body whorl, especially below the periphery. The aperture is oblong. The outer lip somewhat thin, with a sinus rather broad and deep. The columellar margin is oblique. The siphonal canal is abbreviate.

Distribution
This marine species occurs off New Caledonia

References

External links
  Tucker, J.K. 2004 Catalog of recent and fossil turrids (Mollusca: Gastropoda). Zootaxa 682: 1–1295

latiriformis
Gastropods described in 1923